Cove lighting is a form of indirect lighting built into ledges, recesses, or valances in a ceiling or high on the walls of a room. It directs light up towards the ceiling and down adjacent walls. It may be used as primary lighting, or for aesthetic accent, especially to highlight decorative ceilings. Cove lighting is valued because it hides the fixtures, and because it provides a very even light.

Types of cove lights
One method of installing cove lighting is by using T5 fluorescent tubes. T5 luminaires are an energy-efficient alternative to larger luminaires (such as T8 lamps) because they save on materials. An even better energy-efficient alternative is to use LED strips, mounted on an aluminium profiles for optimum heat dissipation, with prismatic covers. With a dimming controller (either analog 1..10V controls or digital, DALI based), the cove lighting can be dimmed. A wide range of LEDs are available, from warm white, daylight and even colour changing RGB modules.

Installation
In kitchens, cove lights can be installed on the top of kitchen cabinets. Luminaire strips should overlap the tubes to reduce the shadow effect at the lamp ends.

References 

Lighting
Architectural lighting design